The 1970 Meath Intermediate Football Championship is the 44th edition of the Meath GAA's premier club Gaelic football tournament for intermediate graded teams in County Meath, Ireland. The tournament consists of 22 teams. The championship starts with a group stage and then progresses to a knock out stage.

No team was relegated from the S.F.C. the previous year.

Martinstown and Star of the Sea were promoted after claiming the 1969 Meath Junior Football Championship title and Junior 'A' Divisional runners-up spot respectively. Garryowen were also promoted from the J.A.F.C.

On 29 November 1970, Dunderry claimed their 3rd Intermediate championship title when they defeated Flathouse 2-9 to 1-3 in the final in Pairc Tailteann, and thus returned the top flight of Meath club football.

Team changes

The following teams have changed division since the 1969 championship season.

From I.F.C.
Promoted to S.F.C.
 Drumree  -  (Intermediate Champions)

Relegated to 1970 J.A.F.C.
 Athboy
 Longwood

To I.F.C.
Regraded from S.F.C.
 None

Promoted from 1969 J.A.F.C.
 Martinstown - (Junior Champions)
 Star of the Sea - (Junior 'A' Divisional Runners-Up)
 Garryowen

Group stage
There are 2 groups called Group A and B. The top two finishers in each group will qualify for the Semi-Finals.

Group A

Round 1:
 Flathouse 2-5, 0-8 Dunderry, Skryne, 15/3/1970,
 Bellewstown w, l Kilmainhamwood, Kilberry, 15/3/1970,
 Syddan w, l Castletown, Kilberry, 15/3/1970,
 Garryowen w, l Rathkenny, Gibbstown, 15/3/1970,
 St. Peter's Dunboyne 3-4, 3-4 St. Mary's, Skryne, 15/3/1970,
 Star of the Sea - Bye,

Round 2:
 Dunderry 0-9, 1-5 Castletown, Kells, 22/3/1970,
 Star of the Sea w, l Garryowen, Duleek, 22/3/1970,
 Flathouse w, l Rathkenny, Skryne, 22/3/1970, 
 St. Peter's Dunboyne w, l Kilmainhamwood, 22/3/1970,
 Bellewstown w, l St. Mary's, Seneschalstown, 22/3/1970,
 Syddan - Bye,

Round 3:
 Garryowen w, l Kilmainhamwood, Castletown, 5/4/1970,
 St. Peter's Dunboyne w, l Rathkenny, Skryne, 5/4/1970,
 Dunderry w, l Star of the Sea, Duleek, 5/4/1970,
 Flathouse w, l Syddan, Seneschalstown, 5/4/1970,
 Castletown w, l St. Mary's, Seneschalstown, 5/4/1970,
 Bellewstown - Bye,

Round 4:
 Flathouse w, l Garryowen, Duleek, 19/4/1970,
 St. Mary's w, l Syddan, Castletown, 19/4/1970,
 Bellewstown w, l Rathkenny, Seneschalstown, 3/5/1970,
 Dunderry w, l Kilmainhamwood, Gibbstown, 3/5/1970,
 Castletown w, l Star of the Sea, Skryne, 3/5/1970,
 St. Peter's Dunboyne - Bye,

Round 5:
 Flathouse w, l Kilmainhamwood, Seneschalstown, 10/5/1970,
 Syddan d, d Bellewstown, Seneschalstown, 10/5/1970,
 Star of the Sea w, l St. Mary's, Duleek, 10/5/1970,
 Garryowen w, l St. Peter's Dunboyne, Kilmessan, 28/6/1970,
 Castletown w/o, scr Rathkenny,
 Dunderry - Bye,

Round 6:
 St. Peter's Dunboyne w, l Syddan, Skryne, 3/5/1970,
 Bellewstown w, l Star of the Sea, ???, 17/5/1970,
 Flathouse w, l St. Mary's, Skryne, 17/5/1970,
 Castletown w, l Kilmainhamwood, Kilberry, 25/4/1970,
 Dunderry w/o, scr Rathkenny, 
 Garryowen - Bye,

Round 7:
 Star of the Sea w, l Syddan, Kilberry, 24/5/1970,
 St. Mary's w, l Kilmainhamwood, Kilberry, 31/5/1970,
 Flathouse w, l Bellewstown, Dunshaughlin, 31/5/1970,
 Garryowen w, l Castletown, Gibbstown, 26/7/1970,
 Dunderry 1-7, 0-2 St. Peter's Dunboyne, Dunshaughlin, 25/10/1970,
 Rathkenny - Bye,

Round 8:
 Dunderry 1-21, 1-0 Syddan, Kilberry, 17/5/1970,
 Garryowen w, l St. Mary's, Seneschalstown, 24/5/1970,
 Flathouse w, l Castletown, Seneschalstown, 7/6/1970,
 Star of the Sea w/o, scr Rathkenny,
 St. Peter's Dunboyne v Bellewstown,
 Kilmainhamwood - Bye,

Round 9:
 Dunderry 2-11, 1-9 Garryowen, Skryne, 2/8/1970,
 Bellewstown w, l Castletown, Skryne, 16/8/1970,
 St. Mary's w/o, scr Rathkenny,
 Syddan w, l Kilmainhamwood,
 Star of the Sea v St. Peter's Dunboyne,
 Flathouse - Bye,

Round 10:
 Dunderry w, l Bellewstown, Seneschalstown, 20/7/1970,
 Flathouse w, l Star of the Sea, Skryne, 20/7/1970,
 Kilmainhamwood w/o, scr Rathkenny,
 Garryowen v Syddan,
 Castletown v St. Peter's Dunboyne,
 St. Mary's - Bye,

Round 11:
 Bellewstown w, l Garryowen, Skryne, 23/8/1970,
 Dunderry w/o, scr St. Mary's, Skryne, 4/10/1970,
 Flathouse w, l St. Peter's Dunboyne,
 Syddan w/o, scr Rathkenny,
 Star of the Sea w/o, scr Kilmainhamwood,
 Castletown - Bye,

Group B

Round 1:
 Martinstown 0-7, 0-5 Enfield, Summerhill, 15/3/1970,
 Ballivor 1-8, 1-4 Summerhill, Trim, 15/3/1970,
 Martry 2-8, 1-3 Gibbstown, Kells, 15/3/1970,
 Moylagh w, l Bohermeen, Kells, 15/3/1970,
 Dunshaughlin w, l Warrenstown, Skryne, 19/4/1970,
 Kilallon - Bye,

Round 2:
 Martinstown 1-9, 1-4 Kilallon, Kells, 22/3/1970,
 Ballivor 2-6, 2-4 Enfield, Trim, 22/3/1970,
 Martry w, l Moylagh, Athboy, 22/3/1970,
 Bohermeen 3-7, 1-3 Gibbstown, Trim, 22/3/1970,
 Summerhill 4-6, 0-5 Warrenstown, Trim, 3/5/1970,
 Dunshaughlin - Bye,

Round 3:
 Martry 2-9, 0-6 Enfield, Trim, 5/4/1970,
 Kilallon w, l Summerhill, Athboy, 5/4/1970,
 Ballivor 2-6, 2-6 Dunshaughlin, Trim, 5/4/1970,
 Martinstown w, l Moylagh, Kells, 19/4/1970,
 Gibbstown w, l Warrenstown, Pairc Tailteann, 17/5/1970,
 Bohermeen - Bye,

Round 4:
 Bohermeen 1-13, 1-9 Enfield, Trim, 19/4/1970,
 Ballivor 1-5, 1-2 Martinstown, Trim, 3/5/1970,
 Dunshaughlin w, l Gibbstown, Seneschalstown, 19/4/1970,
 Kilallon w/o, scr Warrenstown, Kildalkey, 31/5/1970,
 Moylagh 2-8, 1-7 Summerhill, Athboy, 12/7/1970,
 Martry - Bye,

Round 5:
 Dunshaughlin w, l Bohermeen, Skryne, 10/5/1970,
 Martinstown 0-11, 1-5 Martry, Kells, 17/5/1970,
 Kilallon w, l Gibbstown, Athboy, 28/6/1970,
 Ballivor w, l Moylagh, Kildalkey, 30/8/1970,
 Enfield w/o, scr Warrenstown,
 Summerhill - Bye,

Round 6:
 Martry w, l Dunshaughlin, Pairc Tailteann, 26/7/1970,
 Summerhill w, l Enfield, Kildalkey, 26/7/1970,
 Moylagh w/o, scr Warrenstown,
 Ballivor w, l Gibbstown,
 Bohermeen w, l Kilallon,
 Martinstown - Bye,

Round 7:
 Moylagh w, l Gibbstown, Athboy, 24/5/1970,
 Ballivor 1-13, 2-2 Bohermeen, Athboy, 31/5/1970,
 Martry w, l Summerhill, Kilmessan, 16/8/1970,
 Dunshaughlin 2-13, 1-6 Kilallon, Kildalkey, 23/8/1970,
 Martinstown w/o, scr Warrenstown,
 Enfield - Bye,

Round 8:
 Bohermeen 1-8, 1-4 Martry, Pairc Tailteann, 28/6/1970,
 Kilallon w, l Enfield, Kildalkey, 30/8/1970,
 Martinstown w, l Gibbstown, 
 Ballivor w/o, scr Warrenstown,
 Dunshaughlin v Summerhill,
 Moylagh - Bye,

Round 9:
 Dunshaughlin 2-7, 0-10 Moylagh, Kells, 2/8/1970,
 Kilallon 5-6, 4-8 Martry, Kildalkey, 13/9/1970,
 Martinstown 0-10, 1-6 Summerhill, Kildalkey, 4/10/1970,
 Bohermeen w/o, scr Warrenstown,
 Gibbstown v Enfield,
 Ballivor - Bye,

Round 10:
 Martinstown 0-15, 2-4 Dunshaughlin, Trim, 30/8/1970,
 Ballivor 4-6, 0-5 Kilallon, Kells, 25/10/1970,
 Moylagh w, l Enfield,
 Martry w/o, scr Warrenstown,
 Summerhill v Bohermeen,
 Gibbstown - Bye,

Round 11:
 Ballivor 2-10, 2-6 Martry, Athboy, 23/8/1970,
 Martinstown 1-6, 0-6 Bohermeen, Kells, 25/10/1970,
 Moylagh v Kilallon, Kells, 20/9/1970,
 Dunshaughlin w, l Enfield,
 Summerhill w, l Gibbstown,
 Warrenstown - Bye,

Knock-out Stages
The teams in the Semi-Finals are the first and second placed teams from each group.

Semi-Final:
 Flathouse +5, -5 Martinstown, Pairc Tailteann, 8/11/1970,
 Dunderry 2-6, 0-10 Ballivor, Pairc Tailteann, 15/11/1970,
 
Final:
 Dunderry 2-9, 1-3 Flathouse, Pairc Tailteann, 29/11/1970,

References

External links

Meath Intermediate Football Championship
Meath Intermediate Football Championship